Lamprobityle mindanaoensis is a species of beetle in the family Cerambycidae. It was described by Barševskis and Jäger in 2014.

References

Apomecynini
Beetles described in 2014